Nils Tvedt (21 May 1883 – 25 May 1965) was a Norwegian diver. He was born in Fusa, and competed for Bergen Svømme- og Livredningsklubb. He participated at the 1912 Summer Olympics in Stockholm.

References

External links 
 

1883 births
1965 deaths
People from Fusa
Divers at the 1912 Summer Olympics
Olympic divers of Norway
Norwegian male divers
Sportspeople from Vestland